The 1929 Syracuse Orangemen football team represented Syracuse University in the 1929 college football season. The Orangemen were led by third-year head coach Lew Andreas and played their home games at Archbold Stadium in Syracuse, New York. Andreas was succeeded as football coach by Vic Hanson after the season, but remained as the Syracuse basketball coach for 21 more years.

Schedule

References

Syracuse
Syracuse Orange football seasons
Syracuse Orangemen football